Rosalind is a village located in the prairies of central Alberta, Canada.

The name Rosalind was first used in 1905 and is likely an amalgamation of the nearby school districts Montrose and East Lynne.

Rosalind has a number of small businesses, an elementary school and a junior high school. The village provides various municipal services to its residents including fire protection.

Demographics 

In the 2016 Census of Population conducted by Statistics Canada, the Village of Rosalind recorded a population of 188 living in 87 of its 95 total private dwellings, a  change from its 2011 population of 190.

Amenities 
Rosalind has a community hall that holds events such as family reunions and weddings.
The village also has a hockey arena and baseball diamonds.

See also 
List of communities in Alberta
List of villages in Alberta

References

External links 

Camrose County
1966 establishments in Alberta
Villages in Alberta